Lewitt is a surname, and may refer to:

Ben Lewitt (born 1978), English rugby player
Jan Lewitt (1907–1991), Polish-British graphic artist
Maria Lewitt (born 1924), Australian author
Moritz Lewitt (1863–1936), German chess master
Shariann Lewitt (born 1954), American author 
Sol LeWitt (1928–2007), American  artist